Eric Booker (born December 21, 1963) is an American professional golfer who played on the PGA Tour and the Nationwide Tour. He is currently the men's golf coach at Florida Gulf Coast University.

Booker joined the Nationwide Tour in 1990. He then took a hiatus from the Tour until 1997 and won the Nike Greater Austin Open that year. In 1998 he won the Nike Lehigh Valley Open and recorded nine top-10 finishes en route to a 4th-place finish on the money list, earning his PGA Tour card for 1999. On his rookie year on Tour, he recorded a tied for fourth and tied for third finish. He did not do as well on Tour in 2000 and returned to the Nationwide Tour in 2001, his last year on Tour.

Professional wins (2)

Nike Tour wins (2)

*Note: The 1997 Nike Greater Austin Open was shortened to 36 holes due to rain.

Nike Tour playoff record (1–0)

Results in major championships

CUT = missed the half-way cut
Note: Booker never played in the Masters Tournament or The Open Championship.

See also
1998 Nike Tour graduates

External links

American male golfers
Mississippi State Bulldogs golfers
PGA Tour golfers
Korn Ferry Tour graduates
Golfers from Michigan
Sportspeople from Pontiac, Michigan
1963 births
Living people